The Central District of Sonqor County is a district (bakhsh) in Sonqor County, Kermanshah Province, Iran. At the 2006 census, its population was 80,304, in 19,927 families.  The District has one city: Sonqor. The District has five rural districts (dehestan): Ab Barik Rural District, Bavaleh Rural District, Gavrud Rural District, Parsinah Rural District, and Sarab Rural District.

References 

Sonqor County
Districts of Kermanshah Province